Plamen Kazakov (born 26 June 1962) is a former Bulgarian footballer who played as an attacking midfielder and forward. He spent the majority of his career with Spartak Varna.

Career
Kazakov scored 73 league goals in total for Spartak Varna, 39 of which were scored in the first division and 34 in the second division. On 28 September 1983, he scored in a 1–0 home win over Turkish side Mersin in the first round of the 1983–84 European Cup Winners' Cup; Spartak advanced 1–0 on aggregate.

After ten seasons at Spartak, Kazakov joined Paços de Ferreira in 1990, where he scored 3 goals in 17 league matches. After leaving Portuguese club at the end of the 1990–91 season, he re-joined Spartak. 

Kazakov spent one season at Shumen, before joining Cherno More Varna in 1993. The following season, he appeared for his first club Spartak. Kazakov retired from competitive football at the end of the 1995–96 season with Persebaya Surabaya, at the age of 34.

References

External links
Player Profile at foradejogo.net

1962 births
Living people
Bulgarian footballers
Bulgarian expatriate footballers
PFC Spartak Varna players
F.C. Paços de Ferreira players
PFC Cherno More Varna players
First Professional Football League (Bulgaria) players
Second Professional Football League (Bulgaria) players
Liga Portugal 2 players
Expatriate footballers in Portugal
Bulgarian expatriates in Portugal
Association football midfielders
Sportspeople from Varna, Bulgaria
Persebaya Surabaya players
Bulgarian expatriates in Indonesia
Expatriate footballers in Indonesia